Mary Bartlett Bunge (born 1941) is an American neuroscientist currently researching a cure for paralysis at University of Miami, where she is a Professor of Cell Biology.

Early life 
Mary Bartlett was born on April 3, 1931, in New Haven, Connecticut, to George Chapman Bartlett and Margaret Elizabeth Reynolds Bartlett. Her father built and renovated houses, including the house in which she grew up, whereas her mother worked as a painter and decorator. Neither of her parents had a college education, and her father thought that a college education was useless for women. Their careers were filled with an artistic expression that Mary found appealing. After her grandmother taught her how to sew, she expressed herself through art and fashion by designing and making all of her own clothes with the ultimate dream to be a fashion designer in New York City. She strongly considered a career in fashion design, but eventually decided her art interests could just be hobbies. She developed a passion for biology while she was observing the tadpoles swimming around her and questioned how they developed into frogs.

Education 
Bartlett attended Simmons College in Boston to become a laboratory technician. This defied expectations for women at the time as the 1950s female college student was encouraged to marry, start a family, and put an end to her education.

At the end of her junior year at Simmons College, Bartlett was inspired to further her education while attending a program at Jackson Memorial Laboratory, where she witnessed a rabbit's heart contract in a tissue culture. This instance triggered the realization that she did not want to be a lab tech; she wanted to do research, so when she graduated from Simmons College in 1953, she accepted the invitation to graduate school at University of Wisconsin Medical School from Dr. Robert Schilling. He was a professor in the Department of Medical Physiology who offered Mary a research assistantship position when she was studying to obtain her master's degree. They researched intrinsic factor, which is lacking from the gastric juices when one has the condition of pernicious anemia and cannot absorb vitamin B12. Their research had a clinical relevance that influenced her later research to be focused toward clinical applications. This work was the basis of her thesis, which allowed her to graduate with her master's degree in medical physiology in 1955.

While studying for her doctorate at University of Wisconsin Medical School, Mary worked in the Zoology Department with Dr. Hans Ris.   She graduated with her doctorate in 1960.

Personal life 
While at the University of Wisconsin, Mary met a medical student named Richard Bunge, whom she married and shared her personal life as well as her career. They graduated together and moved to Columbia University to begin their post-doctorate research. Soon after settling in, they had two sons, Jonathan, born in 1962, and Peter, born in 1964.

Bunge worked part-time for eight years as a research associate at Columbia University. 

In 1970, the family moved to accept faculty positions at Washington University School of Medicine. She chose to be a Research Assistant Professor rather than be on the tenure-track so she could continue raising her sons, who were still young. Instead, she adjusted to a full-time schedule. By 1974, she had started to teach and was promoted to associate professor with tenure. She was promoted again in 1978 to professor.

Research 
Richard also enriched Bunge's life by introducing her to neuroscience, where she found her purpose and focused her research on while at Washington University School of Medicine. In particular, she focused on researching Schwann cells, which are cells that wrap around the axon of neurons to form the myelin sheath as an insulator to the neuron and to increase the speed impulses are conducted. One of her other major discoveries was that the oligodendrocyte was the cell that made the myelin sheath for the central nervous system. She first discovered this when she examined a section of a kitten's spinal cord in an electron microscope with the oligodendrocyte cell body forming myelin at each end. She also demonstrated that myelin could be reformed in the mature mammalian spinal cord, which has an important clinical relevance in addressing Multiple Sclerosis and spinal cord injuries, where the myelin has been damaged.

Since 1989, Bunge has been a leading part of the Miami Project to Cure Paralysis at University of Miami School of Medicine, where her research on myelin has been implemented. Her husband was invited to be the scientific director of the project, so she was able to work with him there, and when he died in 1996 from esophageal cancer, she took his place at the forefront of the project. The project Bunge took over tests regeneration strategies that could lead to successful treatment of spinal cord injury.

Bunge has the patent in “Schwann Cell Bridge Implants and Phosphodiesterase Inhibitors to Stimulate CNS Nerve Regeneration” from 2009 for the application of restoring function after a central nervous system injury. She has dozens of other patents including "Methods and Systems for Neural Maintenance and Regeneration," "Promoters of Neural Regeneration," and "Phosphodiesterase 4 Inhibitors for Cognitive and Motor Rehabilitation." Her research is now being used for phase one of clinical trials, which gained approval from the FDA in 2012, to evaluate the safety of transplanting the Schwann cells of recently paralyzed patients into the site of their injury.

While the trial has been occurring, Bunge has been working on other combination treatments for future clinical trials. In 2014, she published in the Journal of Neuroscience the promising results of a strategy tested in rat Schwann cells that were engineered to secrete the growth factor D15A and the enzyme Chondroitinase ABC which alters scar composition. This combination lead to more axonal regeneration and functional improvement.

Honors 
Bunge has been a professor of cell biology, neurological surgery, and neurology at the University of Miami for more than 2 decades and has received recognition for her research. In 1996, she received the Wakeman Award for Spinal Cord Repair. She is a three time recipient of the Javitis Neuroscience Investigator Award from the National Institute of Neurological Disorders and Stroke. She was the elected Chair of the Development of Women's Careers in Neuroscience Committee through the Society for Neuroscience from 1994 - 2002. In 2000, she received the Mika Salpeter Women In Neuroscience Lifetime Achievement Award for her leadership in advancing the careers of women in neuroscience. In 2001, she received the Christopher Reeve Research Medal for Spinal Cord Repair. She received the Christine E Lynn Distinguished Professor in Neuroscience Award in 2003 and the Lois Pope LIFE International Research Award in 2005. She was elected to the National Academy of Sciences Institute of Medicine.

Selected publications

References 

1941 births
Living people
American neuroscientists
Scientists from New Haven, Connecticut
Simmons University alumni
University of Miami faculty
University of Wisconsin School of Medicine and Public Health alumni
Washington University in St. Louis faculty
Washington University School of Medicine people
American women neuroscientists
20th-century American women scientists
21st-century American women scientists
Members of the National Academy of Medicine